The unmoved mover or prime mover is a concept advanced by Aristotle as a primary cause (or first uncaused cause) or "mover" of all the motion in the universe. As is implicit in the name, the  moves other things, but is not itself moved by any prior action. In Book 12 of his Metaphysics, Aristotle describes the unmoved mover as being perfectly beautiful, indivisible, and contemplating only the perfect contemplation: self-contemplation. He equates this concept also with the active intellect. This Aristotelian concept had its roots in cosmological speculations of the earliest Greek pre-Socratic philosophers and became highly influential and widely drawn upon in medieval philosophy and theology.

First philosophy 
Aristotle argues, in Book 8 of the Physics and Book 12 of the Metaphysics, "that there must be an immortal, unchanging being, ultimately responsible for all wholeness and orderliness in the sensible world".

In the Physics (VIII 4–6) Aristotle finds "surprising difficulties" explaining even commonplace change, and in support of his approach of explanation by four causes, he required "a fair bit of technical machinery". This "machinery" includes potentiality and actuality, hylomorphism, the theory of categories, and "an audacious and intriguing argument, that the bare existence of change requires the postulation of a first cause, an unmoved mover whose necessary existence underpins the ceaseless activity of the world of motion". Aristotle's "first philosophy", or Metaphysics ("after the Physics"), develops his peculiar theology of the prime mover, as : an independent divine eternal unchanging immaterial substance.

Celestial spheres
Aristotle adopted the geometrical model of Eudoxus of Cnidus, to provide a general explanation of the apparent wandering of the classical planets arising from uniform circular motions of celestial spheres. While the number of spheres in the model itself was subject to change (47 or 55), Aristotle's account of aether, and of potentiality and actuality, required an individual unmoved mover for each sphere.

Final cause and efficient cause

Despite their apparent function in the celestial model, the unmoved movers were a final cause, not an efficient cause for the movement of the spheres; they were solely a constant inspiration, and even if taken for an efficient cause precisely due to being a final cause, the nature of the explanation is purely teleological.

Aristotle's theology 
The unmoved movers, if they were anywhere, were said to fill the outer void, beyond the sphere of fixed stars:

 
The unmoved movers are, themselves, immaterial substance (separate and individual beings), having neither parts nor magnitude. As such, it would be physically impossible for them to move material objects of any size by pushing, pulling, or collision. Because matter is, for Aristotle, a substratum in which a potential to change can be actualized, any and all potentiality must be actualized in a being that is eternal but it must not be still, because continuous activity is essential for all forms of life. This immaterial form of activity must be intellectual in nature and it cannot be contingent upon sensory perception if it is to remain uniform; therefore, eternal substance must think only of thinking itself and exist outside the starry sphere, where even the notion of place is undefined for Aristotle. Their influence on lesser beings is purely the result of an "aspiration or desire", and each aetheric celestial sphere emulates one of the unmoved movers, as best it can, by uniform circular motion. The first heaven, the outmost sphere of fixed stars, is moved by a desire to emulate the prime mover (first cause), in relation to whom, the subordinate movers suffer an accidental dependency.

Many of Aristotle's contemporaries complained that oblivious, powerless gods are unsatisfactory. Nonetheless, it was a life which Aristotle enthusiastically endorsed as one most enviable and perfect, the unembellished basis of theology. As the whole of nature depends on the inspiration of the eternal unmoved movers, Aristotle was concerned to establish the metaphysical necessity of the perpetual motions of the heavens. It is through the seasonal action of the Sun upon the terrestrial spheres, that the cycles of generation and corruption give rise to all natural motion as efficient cause. The intellect, nous, "or whatever else it be that is thought to rule and lead us by nature, and to have cognizance of what is noble and divine" is the highest activity, according to Aristotle (contemplation or speculative thinking, theōríā). It is also the most sustainable, pleasant, self-sufficient activity; something which is aimed at for its own sake. (In contrast to politics and warfare, it does not involve doing things we'd rather not do, but rather something we do at our leisure.) This aim is not strictly human: to achieve it means to live in accordance not with mortal thoughts, but something immortal and divine which is within humans. According to Aristotle, contemplation is the only type of happy activity which it would not be ridiculous to imagine the gods having. In Aristotle's psychology and biology, the intellect is the soul (see also eudaimonia).

First cause 
In Book VIII of his Physics, Aristotle examines the notions of change or motion, and attempts to show by a challenging argument, that the mere supposition of a 'before' and an 'after', requires a first principle. He argues that in the beginning, if the cosmos had come to be, its first motion would lack an antecedent state; and, as Parmenides said, "nothing comes from nothing". The cosmological argument, later attributed to Aristotle, thereby draws the conclusion that God exists. However, if the cosmos had a beginning, Aristotle argued, it would require an efficient first cause, a notion that Aristotle took to demonstrate a critical flaw.

The purpose of Aristotle's cosmological argument, that at least one eternal unmoved mover must exist, is to support everyday change.

In Aristotle's estimation, an explanation without the temporal actuality and potentiality of an infinite locomotive chain is required for an eternal cosmos with neither beginning nor end: an unmoved eternal substance for whom the Primum Mobile turns diurnally and whereby all terrestrial cycles are driven: day and night, the seasons of the year, the transformation of the elements, and the nature of plants and animals.

Substance and change 

Aristotle begins by describing substance, of which he says there are three types: the sensible, which is subdivided into the perishable, which belongs to physics, and the eternal, which belongs to "another science". He notes that sensible substance is changeable and that there are several types of change, including quality and quantity, generation and destruction, increase and diminution, alteration, and motion. Change occurs when one given state becomes something contrary to it: that is to say, what exists potentially comes to exist actually (see potentiality and actuality). Therefore, "a thing [can come to be], incidentally, out of that which is not, [and] also all things come to be out of that which is, but is potentially, and is not actually." That by which something is changed is the mover, that which is changed is the matter, and that into which it is changed is the form.

Substance is necessarily composed of different elements. The proof for this is that there are things which are different from each other and that all things are composed of elements. Since elements combine to form composite substances, and because these substances differ from each other, there must be different elements: in other words, "b or a cannot be the same as ba".

Number of movers 

Near the end of Metaphysics, Book , Aristotle introduces a surprising question, asking "whether we have to suppose one such [mover] or more than one, and if the latter, how many".  Aristotle concludes that the number of all the movers equals the number of separate movements, and we can determine these by considering the mathematical science most akin to philosophy, i.e., astronomy.  Although the mathematicians differ on the number of movements, Aristotle considers that the number of celestial spheres would be 47 or 55.  Nonetheless, he concludes his Metaphysics, Book , with a quotation from the Iliad: "The rule of many is not good; one ruler let there be."

Influence 

John Burnet (1892) noted

Aristotle's principles of being (see section above) influenced Anselm's view of God, whom he called "that than which nothing greater can be conceived." Anselm thought that God did not feel emotions such as anger or love, but appeared to do so through our imperfect understanding. The incongruity of judging "being" against something that might not exist, may have led Anselm to his famous ontological argument for God's existence.

Many medieval philosophers made use of the idea of approaching a knowledge of God through negative attributes. For example, we should not say that God exists in the usual sense of the term; all we can safely say is that God is not nonexistent. We should not say that God is wise; but, we can say that God is not ignorant (i.e. in some way God has some properties of knowledge). We should not say that God is One; but, we can state that there is no multiplicity in God's being.

Aristotelian theological concepts were accepted by many later Jewish, Islamic, and Christian philosophers. Key Jewish philosophers included Samuel Ibn Tibbon, Maimonides, and Gersonides, among many others.  Their views of God are considered mainstream by many Jews of all denominations even today.  Preeminent among Islamic philosophers who were influenced by Aristotelian theology are Avicenna and Averroes.  In Christian theology, the key philosopher influenced by Aristotle was undoubtedly Thomas Aquinas.  There had been earlier Aristotelian influences within Christianity (notably Anselm), but Aquinas (who, incidentally, found his Aristotelian influence via Avicenna, Averroes, and Maimonides) incorporated extensive Aristotelian ideas throughout his own theology.  Through Aquinas and the Scholastic Christian theology of which he was a significant part, Aristotle became "academic theology's great authority in the course of the thirteenth century" and exerted an influence upon Christian theology that become both widespread and deeply embedded.  However, notable Christian theologians rejected Aristotelian theological influence, especially the first generation of Christian Reformers and most notably Martin Luther.  In subsequent Protestant theology, Aristotelian thought quickly reemerged in Protestant scholasticism.

See also 

 Big Bang
 Book of the 24 Philosophers
 Brahman
 Conceptions of God
 Dynamics of the celestial spheres
 Existence of God
 Henosis
 Henotheism
 Logos
 Monad
 The One
 Primum Mobile
 Causa sui
 Tao

Notes

References

Sources 
The Theology of Aristotle in the Stanford Encyclopedia of Philosophy
 
 
 
 

Philosophy of Aristotle
Conceptions of God
Causality
Aristotelianism